Walter Noriega (born 22 Match 1979) is a former Colombian football goalkeeper who last played for Unión Magdalena.

Noriega previously played for Boyacá Chicó F.C. in the Copa Mustang.

Career statistics

Club

See also
Football in Colombia
List of football clubs in Colombia

References

1979 births
Living people
Colombian footballers
Footballers from Medellín
Association football goalkeepers
Boyacá Chicó F.C. footballers
Cienciano footballers
Real Cartagena footballers
Colombian expatriate footballers
Expatriate footballers in Peru